It's Not Cricket is a 1937 British comedy film directed by Ralph Ince and starring Claude Hulbert, Henry Kendall, Betty Lynne and Clifford Heatherley. The film depicts a Frenchwoman married to a cricket-mad Englishman.

It was shot as a quota quickie at Teddington Studios.

Cast
 Claude Hulbert as Willie
 Henry Kendall as Henry
 Betty Lynne as Yvonne
 Sylvia Marriott as Jane
 Clifford Heatherley as Sir George Harlow
 Violet Farebrother as Lady Harlow
 Frederick Burtwell as Morton

References

External links

1937 films
1937 comedy films
1930s English-language films
Films directed by Ralph Ince
British black-and-white films
British comedy films
Lost British films
Films shot at Teddington Studios
Quota quickies
Warner Bros. films
1937 lost films
1930s British films